The 1999–2000 Scottish Second Division was won by Clyde and ended with Alloa Athletic pipping Ross County to second place on the final day of the season thanks to a 6-1 win over Queen of the South, while Ross County could only manage a 2-2 draw away at Stenhousemuir.  The top three were promoted as a result of league reconstruction. Hamilton Academical were relegated after they were docked 15 points for breaking league rules: with the players in dispute with the club management over unpaid wages, the team failed to fulfil a fixture against Stenhousemuir on 1 April 2000 at Ochilview Park.

Table

Top scorers

Attendance

The average attendance for Division Two clubs for season 1999/00 are shown below:

References

Scottish Second Division seasons
2
3
Scot